Tylopilus rigens is a bolete fungus in the family Boletaceae. Found in Japan, it was described as new to science in 1979 by Tsuguo Hongo.

References

External links

Images and description (in Japanese)
Image of spores

rigens
Fungi described in 1979
Fungi of Asia